Hednota bivittella is a species of moth of the family Crambidae described by Edward Donovan in 1805. It is found in Australia, including Tasmania.

References

Crambinae
Moths of Australia
Moths described in 1805